Crooked Oak is an unincorporated community in the Stewarts Creek Township of northern Surry County, North Carolina, United States.  The community is centered on the intersection of Old Lowgap Road and Pine Ridge Road.  Prominent landmarks in the community include Zion Hill Primitive Baptist Church and cemetery.

Unincorporated communities in Surry County, North Carolina
Unincorporated communities in North Carolina